Yaqoob Salem Saleh Al Farsi (born 18 April 1982) is an Omani footballer who plays for Sur SC.

Club career statistics

International career
Yaqoob was selected for the Oman national football team for the first time in 2001. He earned his first international cap for Oman on 7 May 2001 against Philippines in a 2002 FIFA World Cup qualification match. He has represented the national team in the 2002 FIFA World Cup qualification and the 2010 FIFA World Cup qualification.

References

External links
 
 
 

1982 births
Living people
Omani footballers
Oman international footballers
Association football midfielders
Sur SC players
Oman Professional League players